Impalement is the penetration of a human by an object, often as a method of torture or execution.

Impalement or impaled may refer to:

 Impaled (illusion), a magic trick simulating impalement
 Impaled (band), American death metal band
 Impalement, accidental injury, torture or execution
 Impalement arts, a group of performing arts that includes knife throwing
 Impalement (heraldry), a way of combining two coats-of-arms

See also
 Impalefection, gene delivery method